Sergei Mikhailovich Gribov (born 17 May 1969) is a former Russian professional footballer.

Club career
He made his professional debut in the Soviet Second League in 1987 for FC Stal Cheboksary.

References

1969 births
Living people
Soviet footballers
Russian footballers
Association football defenders
PFC Krylia Sovetov Samara players
Russian Premier League players
FC Nosta Novotroitsk players